MV Spirit of Portsmouth is a vessel owned by the Gosport Ferry Company Ltd and built by VT Halmatic Ltd of Portchester.

History
Shortly after being awarded the contract for the current Spirit of Gosport in 2001, Abels Shipbuilders were awarded a follow-on contract for a second ferry, which was to be known as Spirit of Portsmouth. However this vessel was only partially constructed when the ferry company cancelled the order, and the unfinished hull remained at Abel's shipyard for many years, before being completed as a medical missionary ship, the Forth Hope.

The need for a second vessel to run alongside the similar Spirit of Gosport still existed, and the current Spirit of Portsmouth was built in 2005. She is primarily used for cruising Portsmouth Harbour and the Solent, thus enabled Spirit of Gosport to replace Portsmouth Queen on the Gosport to Portsmouth ferry route. The main difference between the two Spirit of vessels is the covered roof and bar on Spirit of Portsmouth, making her more suited to cruising. Spirit of Portsmouth  however, services the ferry route when either Spirit of Gosport, the twin vessel of Spirit of Portsmouth, or the other ferry Harbour Spirit are out of service.

Upon the introduction of Spirit of Portsmouth, the 1966-built Portsmouth Queen was withdrawn from service. The previous vessel that was dedicated to cruise duty was Solent Enterprise. Spirit of Portsmouth is currently the Gosport Ferries flagship. in 2015 they gave her a refit with a new paint job and a new engine with a 2,1 turbine and a new radar.

Characteristics
She carries either 3 or 4 crew depending on the nature of the voyage.

References

External links

Ferries of England
Gosport Ferry
Ships built in England
2005 ships